Clarksburg Downtown Historic District is a national historic district located at Clarksburg, Harrison County, West Virginia.  The district encompasses 119 contributing buildings in 16 blocks of the central business district of Clarksburg. It includes an extraordinary variety of architectural types and styles including Renaissance Revival and Italianate. Notable buildings include the Goff Building (1911), Municipal Building (1888) [demolished] , the Waldo Hotel (1901–1904), Robinson Grand (1912, 1940), Harrison County Courthouse (1931-1932), U.S. Post Office (1932), Masonic Temple (1911–1914), Merchant's National Bank (1894), First United Presbyterian Church (1894), and First Methodist Church (1909, 1956).  Located in the district and separately listed are Waldomore and the Stealey-Goff-Vance House.   The Nathan Goff, Jr. House was delisted in 1994.

It was listed on the National Register of Historic Places in 1982.

References

Commercial buildings on the National Register of Historic Places in West Virginia
National Register of Historic Places in Harrison County, West Virginia
Historic districts in Harrison County, West Virginia
Italianate architecture in West Virginia
Renaissance Revival architecture in West Virginia
Buildings and structures in Clarksburg, West Virginia
Historic districts on the National Register of Historic Places in West Virginia